The 1966 World Series was the championship series of Major League Baseball's (MLB) 1966 season. The 63rd edition of the World Series, it was a best-of-seven playoff between the American League (AL) champion Baltimore Orioles and National League (NL) champion (and defending World Series champion) Los Angeles Dodgers. The Orioles swept the series in four games to capture their first championship in franchise history. It was the last World Series played before MLB introduced the Commissioner's Trophy the following year. The Dodgers suffered record low scoring, accumulating just two runs over the course of the series (both of which were in the first game), the lowest number of runs ever scored by any team in a World Series.

This World Series marked the end of the Dodgers' dynasty of frequent postseason appearances stretching back to 1947. Conversely, it marked the beginning of the Orioles' dynasty of frequent postseason appearances that continued until 1983.

Background
Despite the general consensus that the Orioles were short of pitching compared to the Dodgers and their star hurlers Don Drysdale and Sandy Koufax, Baltimore pitching allowed only two runs in the entire series and ended up with a 0.50 team earned run average (ERA), the second-lowest in World Series history. The Orioles scored more runs in the first inning of the first game than the Dodgers would score in the whole series.

The Orioles got a substantial assist from long-time scout Jim Russo, who spent the first two weeks of September following the Dodgers as they won 12 of 14 games. One of the observations in his 16-page scouting report was that Dodger batters had trouble with the fastball against Gaylord Perry and Larry Dierker. Other points included Maury Wills being the lone bunt threat; left-handed pitchers forcing switch hitters to bat right-handed and Ron Fairly out of the lineup, both to the detriment of the Dodgers; and that Orioles batters should avoid swinging at Koufax's rising fastball above the strike zone. Frank Robinson also added suggestions based on his experiences in the National League when the team went over the scouting report a day prior to the start of the Series.

Boog Powell from the Orioles was the first player to play in the Little League World series and the Major League World Series. Both Powell and the Dodgers' young Jim Barbieri played against each other in their teams game 1 in the 1954 Little League World Series  Little League World Series and the Major League World Series. Barbieri pinch-hit for Dodger relief pitcher Joe Moeller in Game 1 of the series. Barbieri struck out in what would be the final appearance of his brief career.

Route to the World Series

Orioles
After the 1965 season that saw the Orioles finish in third place, they acquired Hall of Famer Frank Robinson from the Cincinnati Reds in exchange for starting pitcher Milt Pappas. Robinson won the Triple Crown and A.L. MVP honors in leading the Orioles to the A.L. pennant by nine games over the Minnesota Twins.

Dodgers
The Dodgers were in a tight pennant race for the fourth time in five years. Going into a season ending double header in Philadelphia, the Dodgers led the San Francisco Giants by two games.  The Giants were in Pittsburgh for a single game, and if they won that game and the Dodgers lost twice, the Giants would have headed to Cincinnati to play a make up game of an earlier rain-out; a win there would force a tie for first place.

In the first game of the double header, the Dodgers made two errors in the bottom of the eighth inning to turn a 3–2 win into a 4–3 loss. Meanwhile, in Pittsburgh, the Giants kept their slim hopes alive by getting a run in the ninth to tie, and four in the 11th to win, 7–3.  The Dodgers needed to win the second game of the doubleheader. Sandy Koufax pitched the Dodgers to a 6–3 win to clinch the pennant. (This appearance, which turned out to be Koufax' last in a regular season game, caused him not to be available for game 1 of the World Series.)

Summary

Matchups

Game 1

In the top of the first inning, after Luis Aparicio flied to right, Drysdale walked Russ Snyder, and then Frank Robinson and Brooks Robinson hit back-to-back home runs to give the Orioles an early 3–0 lead. In the bottom half of the frame, Dave McNally walked Dodger leadoff man Maury Wills, who subsequently stole second. However, the Dodgers failed to score. In the second inning, with Andy Etchebarren on second base, Snyder slapped a base hit past L.A. shortstop Wills and Etchebarren scored to widen the lead to 4–0.

However, McNally soon began to struggle with his command. In the bottom of the second inning, second baseman Jim Lefebvre tagged him for a  home run. First baseman Wes Parker hit a fair ball down the right-field foul line, but a fan reached over the wall and picked the ball out of the dirt, turning a possible triple into a fan interference double. After McNally walked Jim Gilliam, John Roseboro hit a fly ball to right center, but Snyder saved at least a run with a lunging catch, and neither baserunner scored. Drysdale was pulled from the game in the third and replaced with Joe Moeller, who allowed another run in the fourth when Davey Johnson scored from second on a fielder's choice by Aparicio.

This third-inning run, however, would be the Dodgers' last run of 1966.  With one out in the bottom of the third inning, McNally was replaced by Moe Drabowsky after loading the bases on walks. Drabowsky struck out Parker and walked Gilliam, forcing in a run, before Roseboro fouled out. Drabowsky struck out six consecutive batters in the next two innings, tying Hod Eller's record from Game 5 of the scandal-tainted 1919 World Series. Drabowsky's total of 11 strikeouts in  innings of relief are a record for a relief pitcher in a World Series game. The Orioles won 5–2, and the Dodgers would not get another runner across the plate in the series.

Game 2

Game 2 pitted 20-year-old Jim Palmer against the Dodgers' ace Sandy Koufax (both future Hall of Famers), whose 1966 season was among his best with 27 wins, 317 strikeouts, 5 shutouts, and his career best 1.73 ERA. Palmer got into trouble in the second with two on and two out, but walked Roseboro and induced Koufax to pop up to second base. Palmer and Koufax traded zeroes on the scoreboard until the top of the fifth inning, when Koufax's defense let him down.

Boog Powell singled, and then Paul Blair hit a routine fly ball to center, but Willie Davis lost the ball in the sun and both runners were safe on the error. Then, Etchebarren hit another fly to center, but Davis bobbled the ball and then dropped it. Powell scored on the error, and Davis rushed the throw to third base. The throw was high, and Blair scored on the throwing error, Davis' third of the inning - a World Series record that still stands. Aparicio then cracked a stand-up double, scoring Etchebarren from third. Davis was charged with three errors in this inning alone, a World Series record, and all three runs were unearned.

The O's then earned one from Koufax in the sixth as Frank Robinson hit a triple on a fly ball that could have been caught but fell in between Davis and Ron Fairly. Powell drove him in with a single to right-center. Johnson followed with a single to right, and the runners advanced on an error by Ron Fairly. Koufax escaped the inning after walking Blair intentionally to load the bases and getting Etchebarren to ground into a double play. Etchebarren would be the final batter that Koufax ever faced in his career.

Koufax was replaced in the seventh by Ron Perranoski, who set the Orioles down 1-2-3. They would get two from him in the eighth, however, on a walk to Frank Robinson, a single by Brooks Robinson, a sacrifice bunt from Powell and a Johnson single off of Perranoski's glove. Perranoski threw the ball away in an attempt for an out at first, and Brooks scored on the error. Palmer completed the shutout when Roseboro popped to Aparicio, the Orioles' shortstop. Jim Palmer, just nine days shy of his 21st birthday, became the youngest pitcher to throw a shutout in the World Series. Baltimore won 6–0 to take a 2–0 Series lead.

The Dodgers became the third team to make six errors in one game. The Chicago White Sox, both in Game 5 of the 1906 World Series and in Game 5 of the 1917 World Series were the others.

Game 3

The series moved to Baltimore with the Orioles enjoying a 2–0 series lead.

Wally Bunker, plagued with injuries in the regular season, pitched a six-hit, complete game gem, while Osteen allowed only three hits in seven innings. Unfortunately, one of those hits was a home run from Paul Blair in the fifth, which turned out to be the game's only run. The Dodgers' defense woke up after Game 2's six-error embarrassment, and they turned several excellent plays, most notably first baseman Wes Parker's spectacular jump to snare Curt Blefary's sixth inning line drive and rob him of a base hit. Bunker, without a shutout in the regular season, completed the Orioles' second consecutive shutout in this World Series, and they won 1–0.

Game 4

On the brink of a sweep, Game 4 was a rematch of Game 1, pitting the young pitcher Dave McNally against the veteran Don Drysdale, both of whom had struggled in their previous match-up. However, in this outing, both pitchers excelled as Drysdale and McNally each allowed only four hits. Again, the only run scored was on a home run, this one by Frank Robinson. Willie Davis redeemed himself from his miserable Game 2 defensive blunders by robbing Boog Powell of a home run in the fourth, but to no avail as Paul Blair did the same to Jim Lefebvre in the eighth, and the Dodgers were shut out for the third consecutive time and for 33 consecutive innings, a World Series record. The Orioles won Game 4 1–0 to sweep the World Series.

The Orioles became the first American League team other than the Yankees to win the World Series since the 1948 Cleveland Indians. The Orioles also became the last of the original eight American League teams to win a World Series at all. The Orioles had played in the Fall Classic as the St. Louis Browns in the 1944 World Series, in which they were the last original AL team, and the last of the 16 teams that made up the major leagues from 1903 to 1960, to participate in a World Series. They were also the second-to-last "Original 16" MLB team to win a World Series; the 1980 Philadelphia Phillies became the last team to do so 14 years later.

Frank Robinson became the first non-pitcher from a winning World Series team to win the World Series MVP trophy. (Bobby Richardson had won it for the Series-losing New York Yankees in the 1960 World Series.)

The Orioles became the second team in World Series history (the 1937 New York Yankees were the first), not to commit an error in a series of any length, handling 141 total chances (108 putouts, 33 assists).

Composite box
1966 World Series (4–0): Baltimore Orioles (A.L.) over Los Angeles Dodgers (N.L.)

Broadcasting
NBC broadcast the series on both television and radio. In prior years, the local announcers for both the home and away team had split calling the play-by-play for the telecast of each World Series game; however, beginning this year and continuing through , only the home-team announcer would do TV for each game, splitting play-by-play and color commentary with a neutral NBC announcer, while the visiting-team announcer would help call the radio broadcast. Thus, in 1966 NBC's Curt Gowdy (completing his first season as the network's lead baseball voice) worked the telecasts with the Dodgers' Vin Scully for the games in Los Angeles and with the Orioles' Chuck Thompson for the games in Baltimore. Bob Prince, in turn, worked the radio broadcasts with Thompson (in Los Angeles) and Scully (in Baltimore).

Aftermath
This was the last hurrah for the Dodgers of this era. In an eight-year span from 1959 to 1966, they played in four World Series, winning three of them. In addition, they finished second twice (once losing in a playoff) and fourth once. Sandy Koufax, though arguably at the peak of his career, announced his retirement following the World Series because of the chronic arthritis and bursitis in his pitching elbow. In addition, shortstop and 1962 Most Valuable Player Maury Wills was traded to the Pittsburgh Pirates in December. Tommy Davis, the 1962 and 1963 NL batting champion, still not fully recovered from a severely broken ankle suffered in 1965, was traded to the New York Mets after the 1966 season. Finally, third baseman/utility man Jim Gilliam announced his retirement.

The Dodgers still had decent pitching, but their offense was among the worst in the majors. They finished in eighth place in 1967 and in seventh in 1968, before a new group of young players led the team back into contention in 1969. For the 20-year period from 1969 to 1988, the Dodgers won 2 World Series (1981 and 1988), 5 National League pennants (1974, 1977, 1978, 1981, 1988), and 7 National League Western Division titles (1974, 1977, 1978, 1981, 1983, 1985, 1988).

Meanwhile, Baltimore became the dominant American League team in the late 1960s and early 1970s. Injuries slowed the team down in 1967, and they finished second to the 103-win Detroit Tigers in 1968. They won three straight A.L. pennants from 1969–71 (winning over 100 games each season), as well as the 1970 World Series. The Orioles won the American League Eastern Division again in 1973 and 1974, but they fell to the Oakland Athletics dynasty, which went to (and won) the World Series three straight years. The Orioles returned to the World Series in 1979, but they lost to the Pirates in 7 games. The Orioles won at least 90 games in all but three seasons from 1968 through 1983, culminating in their 1983 World Series victory over the Phillies.

Record-low scoring

The 1966 series featured exceptionally low numbers of runs for all concerned, separately and jointly, and also set multiple records for other metrics related to low scoring.

 The series-losing Dodgers scored just 2 runs the entire series, the lowest number of runs ever scored by one team in a World Series, a record unique to 1966. The Orioles were far from productive themselves; scoring only 13 runs, they joined with the Dodgers to log the lowest combined number of runs, 15, ever scored by both teams in a World Series, another record unique to 1966.
 As for series-winning teams, just four other teams have managed to win a World Series while scoring fewer runs than the 1966 Orioles: The 1915 Boston Red Sox and 1963 Los Angeles Dodgers (12 runs each), the 1950 New York Yankees (11 runs), and the unique record holder for least runs scored in a World Series by the series winner, the 1918 Boston Red Sox (9 runs).
 Contributing to the series' low run count, Games 3 and 4 were both 1–0 games.
 The Orioles shut the Dodgers out for a World Series record 33 consecutive innings – from the fourth inning of Game 1 to the end of the series (Game 4).
 Baltimore's pitching staff only allowed two earned runs and finished with a team ERA of 0.50, allowing a 4-game series low 17 hits and limiting the Dodgers to a team batting average of .142, the lowest team average in a series of any length. This topped the World Series team ERA mark of 1.00 set by the 1963 Dodgers in their 4-game sweep of the Yankees, and is second only to the unbreakable record team ERA of 0.00 set in 1905 by the New York Giants.
 The Orioles produced only 10 earned runs, including only 2 over the final 2 games. Their team batting average for the series was .200. Both teams combined to hit only .171, lowest in World Series history, and both teams combined for only 41 hits, lowest ever for a 4-game series.
 The Orioles scored more runs (3) in the first inning of Game 1 than the Dodgers did the whole series (2).

Top American League World Series pitching staffs through 1966:

Notes

See also
1966 Japan Series

References

External links

World Series
Baltimore Orioles postseason
Los Angeles Dodgers postseason
World Series
World Series
World Series
1960s in Baltimore
October 1966 sports events in the United States
Baseball competitions in Baltimore
Baseball competitions in Los Angeles
World